Malikrabot is an urban-type settlement in Navoiy Region, Uzbekistan. It is part of Karmana District. The population in 1989 was 5055 people.

References

Populated places in Navoiy Region
Urban-type settlements in Uzbekistan